is a Japanese volleyball player who plays for the Hisamitsu Springs. She also plays for the Japan women's national volleyball team.

Inoue won a silver medal with the Japan U20 national team at the 2013 FIVB Women's Junior World Championship. She also competed at the 2014 Montreux Volley Masters, 2022 FIVB Volleyball Women's Nations League, 2022 FIVB Volleyball Women's World Championship with the Japan women's national volleyball team.

Inoue won the Most Valuable Player award of 2021–22 V.League Division 1. Hisamitsu Springs were also the tournament champions.

For the 2022-2023 season, Inoue joined Saint-Raphaël Var Volleyball team to compete in French Ligue A.

Clubs 
 Maizuru Yoichi primary school volleyball club
 Shūjitu junior highschool
 Kyoto Prefectural Nishi-Maizuru highschool
University of Tsukuba (2014-2018)
Hisamitsu Springs (2018-

Awards

Individual 
2009 - Junior highschool championship (prefectural)- JVA/JOC Cup (Excellent Player Award)
2013 - Kyoto Prefectural Sports Award

Team 
2013 FIVB Women's Junior World Championship  silver medal

National team
 Junior Team - 2013
 Senior Team - 2014-present

References

External links 
 FIVB - Biography

Japanese women's volleyball players
Sportspeople from Kyoto
1995 births
Living people
Volleyball players at the 2014 Asian Games
Universiade medalists in volleyball
Universiade bronze medalists for Japan
Asian Games competitors for Japan
People from Maizuru
Medalists at the 2015 Summer Universiade
Medalists at the 2017 Summer Universiade
Medalists at the 2019 Summer Universiade
21st-century Japanese women